This is a list of all personnel changes for the 2022 EuroLeague off-season and 2022–23 EuroLeague season.

Retirements

Managerial changes

Managerial changes

Player movements

Between two EuroLeague teams

To a EuroLeague team

Leaving a EuroLeague team

See also 
 List of 2022–23 NBA season transactions

References

Transactions
EuroLeague transactions